The sixth series of British drama series Bad Girls premiered on 14 April 2004. It consists of twelve episodes. The first four episodes were broadcast on Wednesday nights, with episode five moved to Monday and episodes six to eight broadcast over consecutive nights beginning the following Monday. After a 12-week hiatus, the remaining episodes of the series were screened Monday nights and concluded on 23 August 2004.

This series introduces Eva Pope (Frances Myers), Dannielle Brent (Natalie Buxton) and Antonia Okonma (Darlene Cake), while 
Pauline Campbell (Al McKenzie), Charlotte Lucas (Selena Geeson) and  Jennifer Ness (Kris Yates) depart the series. Special guest appearances include Claire King, returning for the final time as Karen Betts, and Zöe Lucker appearing as Tanya Turner in a crossover from Footballers Wives.

Cast
Main cast

 Eva Pope as Frances Myers
 Charlotte Lucas as Selena Geeson
 Jack Ellis as Jim Fenner
 Tristan Sturrock as Colin Hedges
 Jennifer Ness as Kris Yates 
 Dannielle Brent as Natalie Buxton
 Antonia Okonma as Darlene Cake
 Victoria Bush as Tina O'Kane
 Pauline Campbell as Al McKenzie
 James Gaddas as Neil Grayling 
 Stephanie Beacham as Phyl Oswyn
 Amanda Barrie as Bev Tull
 Tracey Wilkinson as Di Barker
 Helen Fraser as Sylvia Hollamby
 Victoria Alcock as Julie Saunders
 Kika Mirylees as Julie Johnston
 Philip McGough as Malcolm Nicholson 

Special guest
 Claire King as Karen Betts
 Zöe Lucker as Tanya Turner
 Meera Syal as Janan Hammad

Recurring and guest cast
Recurring cast:

 Geff Francis as Rick Revoir
 Richard Mylan as Benjamin Phillips
 Nikki Amuka-Bird as Officer Paula Miles
 Holly Palmer as Milly Yates

Guest cast:

 Adam Christopher as PO Jenkins
 Milo Twomey as Paul Knights
 David Baukham as DI Reign
 Janine Wood as Forensics officer
 David Fleeshman as DI Harwell
 Liam Noble as Officers' club barman
 Chrissie Cotterill as Sue Yates
 Gordon Peaston as PO Paddle
 Janice Acquah as Reporter
 Hebe Chitnis as Ishrat Hammad
 Margaret Blakemore as Female journalist
 Christopher Peacock as TV News reporter
 Stuart Organ as Duty Officer Smithson
 Gloria Onitri as Marcia
 Moshe Dennis as Terence Cake
 Jennifer MacDonald-Anderson as DST Officer
 Lisa Bowerman as Doctor
 Paul Brightwell as DI Ackroyd
 Carolyn Bazely as Dr. Lo
 Stephen Rahman Hughes as Stuart Jones
 Glyn Lewis as Security guard
 Fiona Gillies as Rosalind Oxborough
 David Yelland as Gregory Hedley
 Richard Walker as Judge
 Francis Magee as Rob Skelton
 June Page as Mrs. Welles
 Tim Frances as Sergeant Ledwell
 Anna Maria Ashe as Newsreader
 Don McCorkindale as Frank Twigg
 Carrie Davies as Registrar
 Jonathan Maitland as Reporter

Storylines
The story picks up six weeks following Yvonne's death. Fenner is having recurring nightmares of Yvonne suffocating and struggling to get out of the hanging cell. The inmates are finally off lock down, restless, yet happy, believing that Yvonne has escaped. Kris, still determined to follow Yvonne's route to the hanging cell, needs the help of Selena if she is to make a successful escape. Meanwhile, two new prisoners arrive on G-wing; Frances Allen is in for prostitution, while Natalie Buxton claims she was sentenced for income tax fraud. When the other inmates discover that Natalie is in fact a sex trafficker, they are determined to make her suffer, despite telling them that she is innocent. Natalie enlists the help of Frances to protect her for a favor in return. It is later discovered that Natalie is in fact guilty and that Frances is an undercover police officer, Frances Myers and was sent to Larkhall expose her guilt. Natalie is transferred and Frances is made governor of G-Wing. The new position of wing governor causes friction between Di and Neil, as Di is forced to return to basic grade officer. Kris manages to find her way to the hanging cell only to make a shocking discovery. Now realising that there is no possible means of escape, she informs Selena that she has found Yvonne's body. Upon the news of Yvonne's death, the inmates, especially Julie Saunders, know that Fenner was behind it. Hell-bent on making him pay, Fenner becomes unstable, attacking inmates such as Kris Yates and exposing himself to the entire wing and is placed under the mental health act.

Episodes

Reception

Ratings

Awards and nominations
 National Television Awards (2004) – Most Popular Drama (Nominated)
 TV Quick Awards (2004) – Best Actor – Jack Ellis (Won)

Home media
 United Kingdom
 "Series Six" – 16 May 2005 (3-DVD set distributed by 2 Entertain)
 "The Complete Series Six" re-release – 20 June 2005 (3-DVD set distributed by Acorn Media UK) 
 As part of "The Complete Collection" – 24 July 2006 (28-DVD set distributed by Acorn Media UK)
 Australia
 "Series Six" – 4 July 2005 (3-DVD set distributed by Shock Records) 
 As part of "The Complete Collection" – 10 November 2010 (32-DVD set distributed by Shock Records)  
 "Series Six" re-release (individual from "The Complete Collection") – 11 May 2011 (3-DVD set distributed by Shock Records)

Other media
On 23 August 2004, following the Series Six finale on ITV, a special, Bad Girls: Most Wanted was aired on ITV2 and hosted by Jack Ellis. The special counted down the top 10 most popular bad girls from the first six series. It also featured scenes from Bad Girls: The Musical and bloopers.

The top 10 bad girls are listed as follows:

 10 – Tina O'Kane 
 9  – The Two Julies 
 8  – Natalie Buxton
 7  – Phyl and Bev: The Costa Cons
 6  – Denny Blood
 5  – Kris Yates
 4  – Darlene Cake
 3  – Nikki Wade
 2  – Shell Dockley
 1  – Yvonne Atkins

References

External links
 
 Bad Girls Season 6 at the Internet Movie Database

06
2004 British television seasons